Grace Elizabeth Gold (born August 17, 1995), known as Gracie Gold, is an American figure skater. She is a 2014 Olympic team event bronze medalist, the 2014 NHK Trophy champion, the 2015 Trophée Éric Bompard champion, and a two-time U.S. national champion (2014, 2016). She is also a two-time World Team Trophy champion (2013, 2015).

On the junior level, she is the 2012 World Junior silver medalist, the 2011 JGP Estonia champion, and the 2012 U.S. junior national champion.

Gold is the first and only American woman to win an NHK Trophy title. She also holds the record for the highest short program score ever recorded by an American woman: 76.43, scored in the 2016 World Championships.

Personal life
Grace Elizabeth Gold was born on August 17, 1995, in Newton, Massachusetts. She is the daughter of Denise, an ER nurse, and Carl Gold, an anesthesiologist. Her fraternal twin sister, Carly Gold (named after their father), is younger by 40 minutes and also competed in figure skating.

Gold was raised in Springfield, Missouri, before moving to Springfield, Illinois. She has also stated that she has lived in Corpus Christi, Texas. She attended ninth grade at Glenwood High School in Chatham, Illinois, before switching to online education through the University of Missouri. She has taken ballet lessons to improve her performance.

Gold has been open about her mental health struggles, including her treatment for anxiety, depression, and an eating disorder. She discussed having suicidal thoughts after moving alone to Michigan in 2017 and isolating herself in her apartment. Teammate Ashley Wagner first prompted U.S. Figure Skating officials to seek treatment for Gold in 2016, but Gold did not accept their help until "snapping" in front of judges at the same USFSA event in 2017. Since returning to skating, she has redefined her goals and aimed to find a healthier approach to the sport. Upon reflecting on her journey, Gold told reporters in December 2019: "Yes, things could be better, but look how far I've come." Gold was featured in The Weight of Gold (2020), an HBO Sports Documentary which "explor(es) the mental health challenges that Olympic athletes often face."

As of 2022, she is in with a relationship with the two-time British junior ice dance national champion James Hernandez.

Career
Gold started skating at age 8 after attending a friend's birthday party at her local rink in Springfield, Missouri. She subsequently began training with Amy Vorhaben and Max Liu before changing coaches to work with Alexia Griffin. Later she joined Susan Liss and then switched to Toni Hickey in Springfield, Illinois. Her next coach was Alex Ouriashev, who worked with her at two rinks in the Chicago area.

Gold competed in pairs with Sean Hickey. They placed eighth in juvenile pairs at the 2007 U.S. Junior Championships.

Gold was fourth on the novice level at the 2010 U.S. Championships. The next season she competed on the junior level but finished sixth at the Midwestern Sectionals and failed to qualify for the national championships. After the event she began preparing for the following season by working to increase her technical content.

2011–12 season: International debut and World Junior Silver Medalist 

Gold made her international debut at the Junior Grand Prix in Tallinn, Estonia, winning gold. She then qualified for the 2012 U.S. Championships on the junior level, where she won both the short and long programs to win the gold medal. Her total of 178.92 points is a record for a junior lady at the U.S. Championships. Gold won gold in all seven of her competitions this season leading into the U.S. Championships. She then competed at the 2012 World Junior Championships in Minsk, Belarus. Gold won the silver medal at the event. She signed with International Management Group.

Gold was named to the U.S. team for the 2012 World Team Trophy. At her senior international debut, she finished fifth overall behind fellow Junior Worlds medalist Adelina Sotnikova. Team USA finished second overall.

2012–13 season : senior debut   

Gold finished seventh in her senior Grand Prix debut at the 2012 Skate Canada. She then worked with a sports psychologist on her focus and refined her programs in Canton, Michigan. At her second event, the 2012 Rostelecom Cup, she won the silver medal. At her first senior U.S. Nationals, Gold placed ninth in the short program and first in the free skate, winning the silver medal overall with a score of 186.57 points. She was named to compete at the 2013 Four Continents, where she finished sixth. At the 2013 World Championships, she placed ninth in the short program, fifth in the free skate, and sixth overall setting a new personal best total score of 184.25 points. Gold's sixth-place finish along with teammate Ashley Wagner's fifth-place finish secured three spots for the U.S. women at the 2014 Winter Olympics.

At the 2013 World Team Trophy in Tokyo, Gold placed third in the short program and third in the free skate to finish third overall, setting a personal and season best score total of 188.03 points. Team USA won the team gold for the second time since 2009.

In July 2013, Gold became a Pandora Jewelry ambassador.

2013–14 season: First national title & Olympic medal

After parting ways with coach Alex Ourashiev in late August 2013, Gold trained with Marina Zoueva and Oleg Epstein in Canton, Michigan, while searching for a new permanent coach. She took silver at her first event of the season, the U.S. International Figure Skating Classic.
After the event she traveled to California for a week-long tryout with Frank Carroll at the Toyota Sports Center in El Segundo. On September 25, 2013, it was announced that Carroll would be her permanent coach.

During the 2013–14 ISU Grand Prix series, Gold competed at the 2013 Skate Canada, placing first in the short program with a personal best of 69.45 and third in the free skate, winning the bronze medal overall. At the 2013 NHK Trophy she finished fourth. Gold was the third alternate for the Grand Prix Final.

At the 2014 U.S. Championships, Gold placed first in the short program with 72.12 points, the highest-ever ladies' score earned at the U.S. Championships under the ISU Judging System. She went on to win the free skate with another record score of 139.57, thus securing her first senior national title. She was named to the U.S. team for the 2014 Winter Olympics in Sochi, Russia. She won a bronze medal in the Olympic team event and finished fourth in the ladies singles event with a score of 205.53 points. Gold was assigned to the 2014 World Championships in Saitama, Japan, where she placed fifth overall. At the end of the season, she performed with Stars On Ice.

2014–15 season: NHK Trophy title
Gold began her season at the 2014 Nebelhorn Trophy, an ISU Challenger Series event, where she won the bronze medal behind Russians Elizaveta Tuktamysheva and Alena Leonova. For the 2014–15 ISU Grand Prix season, Gold was assigned the 2014 Skate America and the 2014 NHK Trophy. She won bronze at Skate America and gold at NHK Trophy, the latter marking her first win at a Grand Prix event, and the first time an American woman won the event. She qualified for her first Grand Prix Final, but withdrew on December 4, 2014, due to a stress fracture in her left foot.

Gold won a silver medal at the 2015 U.S. Championships with a score of 205.54 after finishing second in both the short program and free skate. At the 2015 Four Continents Championships, Gold placed second in the short program with a score of 62.67 but fifth in the free skate with a score of 113.91, finishing fourth overall with a score of 176.58.

At the 2015 World Championships, Gold placed eighth place in the short program with a score of 60.73, her lowest score of the season. Gold came back in the free skate with a score of 128.23, which was her season's best and second highest free skate score of the ladies event. She finished fourth overall, her highest placement at a World Championship so far.

Gold competed on Team USA at the 2015 World Team Trophy. She placed first in the short program with a score of 71.26, the highest score ever recorded for an American woman in an ISU event. However, she placed fifth in the free skate. Overall Team USA placed first.

2015–16 season: Second national title
 
Gold's 2015–16 Grand Prix Series assignments were the 2015 Skate America and 2015 Trophée Éric Bompard. Gold won the silver medal at Skate America, behind Russia's Evgenia Medvedeva. She then continued her season placing first in the short program at Trophée Éric Bompard, with a score of 73.32.    The event was cancelled on November 14 due to the state of emergency in France following the November 2015 Paris attacks. On November 23, the ISU announced that the short program standings would stand as final placements. This secured Gold a spot in the 2015 Grand Prix Final, where she placed 5th in both the short and free programs, ranking 5th overall.

On January 23, Gold earned her second National title at the 2016 U.S. Championships in Saint Paul, Minnesota. After regaining her national crown she placed fifth at the 2016 Four Continents Championships in Taipei, Taiwan.

Gold went on to competing at the 2016 World Championships in Boston where she placed first in the short program with a score of 76.43, the highest short program score ever recorded by an American woman. Placing sixth in the free program, she dropped to fourth place overall. To finish her season, Gold competed at the inaugural 2016 KOSÉ Team Challenge Cup, where she would help Team North America win the gold medal.

2016–17 season: Personal struggles 
Gold was assigned to two Grand Prix events, Skate America and Trophée de France. She began her season at the 2016 Japan Open. In the free skate, she earned a score of 108.24, and helped Team North America win the bronze medal. At 2016 Skate America, Gold placed third in the short program with a score of 64.87 behind American Ashley Wagner and Japan's Mai Mihara after a fall on her triple flip. She struggled in the free skate, suffering multiple falls, and dropped to 5th overall with a total score of 184.22. Gold cited "post worlds summer depression" as a reason for not being prepared, commenting that she had only recently "felt like herself again". Her struggles continued at the 2016 Tropheé de France; she scored a combined total of 165.89 for 8th place, the worst Grand Prix finish of her career.

In late December 2016, Gold resumed her collaboration with her former coach, Alex Ouriashev, training with him in Chicago before returning to Los Angeles, where she was coached by Frank Carroll. She finished 6th at the 2017 U.S. Championships, and was left off the Four Continents and World Championship teams for the first time in her senior career; she had previously been on every world championship team starting in 2013. Carroll announced after the event that they would part company. He didn't inform Gold before telling the media, causing major backlash on social media. However, Gold still stated that despite being surprised about Carroll's decision to tell the media before informing her, she maintained the "upmost respect for Frank" and would take the time to make the right decision on coaching arrangements heading into the Olympic season.

On February 8, 2017, Gold announced that Marina Zoueva and Oleg Epstein would be her trainers (Epstein is also a choreographer) at the Arctic Edge ice rink in Canton, Michigan.

According to Lindsay Crouse, a writer with The New York Times, Nike had a pattern of pushing the young women it sponsored to lose excessive amounts of weight. She wrote that pressure from Nike's coaches helped trigger Gold to show disordered eating so profound she considered taking her own life.

2017–18 season 
Gold withdrew from the Japan Open, set to be her season open, and also withdrew from the 2017 CS Ondrej Nepela Trophy due to personal reasons. Gold had been assigned to two Grand Prix events, 2017 Cup of China and 2017 Internationaux de France, both of which she withdrew from in October due to ongoing treatment for anxiety, depression, and an eating disorder. Gold later withdrew from U.S. Nationals stating she would not have proper training beforehand. At the end of the season, it was reported Gold was hired as a coach in Arizona.

2018–19 season: Comeback 

Following rumors that she would be returning to the sport, it was announced on June 28, 2018 that Gold was assigned to compete at the 2018 Rostelecom Cup. Her coach is Vincent Restencourt based in Pennsylvania. Former figure skater Jeremy Abbott choreographed her short and long programs. It was said that Gold's new short program portrays a more playful and sexy character and her free program portrays her journey from her personal struggles to her comeback. At the 2018 Rostelecom Cup, in the short program, she doubled her triple Lutz-triple toe loop combination, under-rotated and fell on her triple flip, and popped her planned double Axel. She scored 37.51, the lowest short program score she has ever received since the start of her junior career, placing her in 10th and last place. Gracie announced via Twitter her withdrawal from the free skate in order to not damage her mental health and confidence because of her short program. She later stated that she was working towards 2019 US Nationals; however, on January 9, 2019, she announced her withdrawal from Nationals in order to further prepare for the 2019–2020 season. She also stated that she is working towards the 2022 Winter Olympics in Beijing. Videos taken by her coach posted on Instagram have shown that she has begun to practice jumps off the harness and is successfully landing them.

2019–2020 season 
Being ineligible for a spot at a Grand Prix event, Gold is to compete at domestic regional competitions in an attempt to earn a spot at the 2020 U.S. Championships. Restencourt began posting promising videos of Gold attempting triple Axels and quadruple salchows in harness on his Instagram, as well as every triple jump. At the 2020 U.S. South Atlantic Regional Atlantic Championships, Gold placed third in the short program and fourth in the free program after making significant errors in both programs. However, Gold placed third overall and advanced to the 2020 Eastern Sectional Championships, where she won the bronze medal, thus earning her a qualifying spot for the 2020 U.S. Championships. She placed twelfth at the national championships.

2020–2021 season 
Gold was named to U.S. Figure Skating's international selection pool, meaning she is eligible to compete at international events in the 2020–2021 figure skating season and will be considered for assignment to such events. She was assigned to compete at the 2020 Skate America, the ISU having decided to run the Grand Prix based mainly on skaters' training locations to limit international travel during the coronavirus pandemic. She finished twelfth.

Gold placed thirteenth at the 2021 U.S. Championships.

2021–2022 season 
Gold was sixth in the short program at the 2022 U.S. Championships, but dropped to tenth place overall after the free skate.

2022–2023 season 
Approaching the new season, Gold said that "I really want to transition from the 'good for her for being out there' mentality...to, 'Oh, she's really, really good. And she's really competitive.'" She won the bronze medal at the Philadelphia Summer International, in the process becoming the oldest female skater to land a triple Lutz-triple toe loop combination in internationaly competition, at age 27. Gold was twelfth at the 2022 CS Nebelhorn Trophy, and placed sixth at the 2022 Skate America. At the 2023 U.S. Figure Skating Championships, Gold once again landed a triple Lutz-triple toe loop combination in her short program to place 5th. She placed 11th in the free skate to place 8th overall, her best result since 2017.

Skating technique

Gold is best known for her fast spins and strong jumps. She has executed multiple triple-triple jump combinations in international competition, including the 3Lz-3T, 3S-3T, 3F-3T, 3Lo+3T, 3T+3T, as well as the 2A-3T, 3F-2T, 3F+2T+2T, and the 2A-3T-2T combo. She has landed the 2A-Eu-3F and the 2A-Eu-3F-3T in practice. Gold has resumed trying to learn the triple Axel after several years not training the element, but she is only at the stage where she is using a harness. She has also recently began training the quadruple salchow and the quadruple lutz, but is also in the stage where she is solely using the harness.

Endorsements
In October 2013, Gold was named as a face of CoverGirl. She appeared on the cover of Sports Illustrated's February 2014 issue, GQ Japan, and Teen Vogue. Later, she was named the 2014 Sportswoman of the Year by the Los Angeles Council, and received an award that March during the L.A. Sports ceremony. She is an ambassador for the KOSÉ Infinity beauty product.

Gold is sponsored by John Wilson, her blade manufacturer Pattern-99 (she is the brand ambassador); Edea, her skating boot manufacturer; Visa; United Airlines; Procter & Gamble; Redbull; and Nike.

Programs

Competitive highlights

GP: Grand Prix; CS: Challenger Series; JGP: Junior Grand Prix

Detailed results
Small medals for short and free programs awarded only at ISU Championships. Pewter medals for fourth-place finishes awarded only at U.S. national and regional events. At team events, medals awarded for team results only. ISU Personal bests highlighted in bold.

Junior level

References

External links

 
 
 
 
 
 
 
 Gracie Gold  at IceNetwork.com

1995 births
Living people
American female single skaters
Sportspeople from Newton, Massachusetts
World Junior Figure Skating Championships medalists
Sportspeople from Springfield, Missouri
Sportspeople from Springfield, Illinois
Twin sportspeople
American twins
Figure skaters at the 2014 Winter Olympics
Medalists at the 2014 Winter Olympics
Olympic medalists in figure skating
Olympic bronze medalists for the United States in figure skating
21st-century American women